Longir-e Sofla (also Romanized as Longīr-e Soflá and Longīr Soflá; also known as Longīr and Longīr-e Pā’īn) is a village in Dorunak Rural District, Zeydun District, Behbahan County, Khuzestan Province, Iran. At the 2006 census, its population was 304, in 64 families.

References 

Populated places in Behbahan County